Elisabeth Frisk (October 24, 1909 – February 27, 1986) was Swedish stage and film actress active in the 1920s and 1930s.  She played the female lead in nine films from 1929 to 1934 during the early sound era.

Filmography
 Parisiennes (1928)
 Say It with Music (1929)
 The People of Norrland (1930)
 Frida's Songs (1930)
 Dante's Mysteries (1931)
 Erämaan turvissa (1931)
 Half Way to Heaven (1931)
 Dangerous Paradise (1931)
 A Night of Love by the Öresund (1931)
 A Wedding Night at Stjarnehov (1934)

References

Bibliography
 Goble, Alan. The Complete Index to Literary Sources in Film. Walter de Gruyter, 1999.
 Gustafsson, Tommy. Masculinity in the Golden Age of Swedish Cinema: A Cultural Analysis of 1920s Films. McFarland, 2014.

External links

1909 births
1986 deaths
Swedish stage actresses
Swedish film actresses
Swedish silent film actresses
20th-century Swedish actresses

sv:Elisabeth Frisk